Matthew Clark is a United Kingdom-based drinks distributor.

Matthew or Matt Clark may also refer to:
Mat Clark (born 1990), Canadian ice hockey defenceman
Matt Clark (actor) (born 1936), American actor and director
Matt Clark (baseball) (born 1986), American baseball first baseman
Matt Clark (darts player) (born 1968), English darts player
Matt Clark (footballer) (born 1992), English football midfielder
Matt Clark (Canadian football) (played 1991–1998), Canadian football player
Matt Clark (writer) (1967–1998), short story writer and novelist
Matt Clark (The Young and the Restless), a fictional character from the American CBS soap opera The Young and the Restless
Matthew H. Clark (1937–2023), American prelate of the Roman Catholic Church
Matthew Clark, American drummer in Ostinato, Premonition 13, and White Rabbits

See also
Matt Clarke (disambiguation)
Matthew Clerk (1659–1735), Irish Presbyterian minister

Clark, Matthew